The Hushe River is a tributary river to the Shyok River which itself is tributary to the Indus River. The main source of the Hushe River is the Gondogoro Glacier. Some streams also flow from other glaciers of the Hushe valley. The Hushe river joins with Saltoro River at Haldi village before joining the Shyok River. Both the Hushe and Saltoro rivers join the Shyok river at the Tsa thang Ghursa village.

References

Rivers of Gilgit-Baltistan
Rivers of Pakistan